Two of a Kind is a 1983 American romantic fantasy crime comedy-drama film directed by John Herzfeld and starring John Travolta and Olivia Newton-John. The film reunited Travolta and Newton-John who had appeared together in 1978's Grease. The original musical score was composed by Patrick Williams. Travolta plays a cash-strapped inventor while Newton-John plays the bank teller whom he attempts to rob. They must come to show compassion for one another in order to delay  God's judgment upon the Earth. Despite being a critical failure, the film's soundtrack was a commercial success, yielding three hit singles for Newton-John and being certified Platinum.

Plot
Four angels — Charlie (Charles Durning), Earl (Scatman Crothers), Gonzales (Castulo Guerra), and Ruth (Beatrice Straight) — have been in charge of Heaven for the last twenty-five years. They are playing a golf match in Heaven when their game is interrupted by God (voiced by Gene Hackman), who has returned to the office and does not like what he sees down on Earth. God wants to order up another flood and start all over again (despite his promise in the rainbow that he never would again), but the four angels persuade him to reconsider, reasoning that, if a typical Earth man can reform, it would prove that all mankind is capable of it.

God agrees to the scheme, and the typical Earth man selected by the angels is Zack Melon (John Travolta), a failed inventor who, threatened by loan sharks, decides to hold up a bank. Zack points his gun at bank teller Debbie Wylder (Olivia Newton-John), who ostensibly gives him all the money. However, when Zack peers into the sack after the robbery, he sees that Debbie has substituted bank deposit slips for the cash and has kept the money for herself. Zack tracks her down to reclaim his stolen money. While dodging the loan sharks and the evil interventions of the Devil (Oliver Reed), the two come to develop a romantic relationship which is put to the test when they are threatened by a masked thug.

Cast
 John Travolta as Zack Melon
 Olivia Newton-John as Debbie Wylder
 Charles Durning as Charlie
 Oliver Reed as Beasley/The Devil
 Beatrice Straight as Ruth
 Scatman Crothers as Earl
 Richard Bright as Stuart
 Toni Kalem as Terri
 Ernie Hudson as Detective Skaggs
 Jack Kehoe as Mr. Chotiner
 Robert Costanzo as Captain Cinzari
 Castulo Guerra as Gonzales
 Gene Hackman as God (uncredited)

Filming
The film was originally called Second Chance and was to be directed by Richard Rush.

Principal photography of Two of a Kind took place from May 9 to July 21, 1983, beginning in New York City with two weeks of location shooting and then continuing in California at 20th Century Fox Studios in Century City, MGM Studios in Culver City and The Burbank Studios in Burbank. The heaven scene was shot on MGM's Stage 27.

Newton-John recorded a song "Twist of Fate" which was played over the end credits. It proved so popular on radio that release of the film was delayed to redo the film's soundtrack.

Reception
Roger Ebert gave the film one-and-a-half stars out of four and wrote, "The romance, alas, never really gets airborne, if only because Travolta, Newton-John and the plot are followed everywhere by countless unnecessary supporting characters." Janet Maslin of The New York Times asked, "Can it really have been that difficult to find a passable screen vehicle for John Travolta and Olivia Newton-John? Any old romantic fluff should have sufficed, and yet something as horrible as 'Two of a Kind' has been tailor-made for its stars. The results are so disastrous that absolutely no one is shown off to good advantage, with the possible exception of the hairdressers involved." Todd McCarthy of Variety slammed the film as "an embarrassment of the first order ... Aside from the presence of the two stars, confection has all the earmarks of a bargain-basement job."

Gene Siskel of the Chicago Tribune gave the film two-and-a-half stars out of four and wrote that director John Herzfeld "has placed one of America's favorite fantasy couples in a gimmick-filled story that requires the almost-constant presence of seven of the dullest supporting characters you'll ever meet. That's too bad, because whenever Newton-John and Travolta are on screen together, 'Two of a Kind' flashes with a spark of entertainment, and you want to tell them to get up and go to another film where they can have a long talk or makeout scene together."

Sheila Benson of the Los Angeles Times said that with "flaccid direction, ugly photography and performances that rely on charm generated a few movies ago (and sealed in plastic), you have reason enough to give 'Two of a Kind' a wide berth." Rita Kempley of The Washington Post wrote, "The acting's not all that bad, but the script is."

Filmink magazine later wrote the two stars "really shouldn’t have been so snobby about Grease 2 if this is what they did instead."

Two of a Kind was nominated for five Razzie Awards: Worst Actor (Travolta, also for Staying Alive), Worst Actress (Newton-John), Worst Director (Herzfeld), Worst Screenplay, and Worst Picture. The movie was nominated for a Stinkers Bad Movie Award for Worst Picture.

As of November 2022, the film holds a 17% rating on Rotten Tomatoes based on 12 reviews.

Soundtrack

The film was salvaged by a platinum soundtrack which yielded three singles for Newton-John:

 "Twist of Fate" - No. 5 Pop (her last of 15 Top 10 Pop hits)
 "Take a Chance" (duet with John Travolta) - No. 3 AC (B-side to "Twist of Fate")
 "Livin' in Desperate Times" - No. 31 Pop

The album was further bolstered by featuring "Ask the Lonely", a song which the rock group Journey had initially intended for their 1983 album Frontiers but which was only available on the soundtrack album (No. 3 Mainstream Rock); it was also added to the playlist of a few Pop stations but did not chart there.  Additionally included was Patti Austin's "It's Gonna Be Special", which was not a major Pop hit, but peaked at #15 on the R&B charts and #5 on the Dance charts in 1984.

References

External links
 
 
 
 
 The Two of A Kind Only Olivia movie website

1983 films
American fantasy comedy films
1983 romantic comedy films
American romantic comedy films
1983 directorial debut films
1980s romantic fantasy films
Films about angels
Films about bank robbery
Films about God
Films set in heaven
Films set in New York City
20th Century Fox films
Films directed by John Herzfeld
Films scored by Patrick Williams
The Devil in film
1980s English-language films
1980s American films